Fokino is a town in Bryansk Oblast, Russia, located on the Bolva River (Desna's tributary)  north of Bryansk. Population:

History
Town status was granted to it in 1954.

Administrative and municipal status
Within the framework of administrative divisions, Fokino is incorporated as Fokinsky Urban Administrative Okrug—an administrative unit with the status equal to that of the districts. As a municipal division, Fokinsky Urban Administrative Okrug is incorporated as Fokino Urban Okrug.

Prior to January 1, 2013, Fokino was administratively incorporated as a town of district significance within Dyatkovsky District.

References

Notes

Sources

External links

Official website of Fokino 
Fokino Business Directory 

Cities and towns in Bryansk Oblast
1954 establishments in the Soviet Union